Vikram Sirikonda is an Indian film director and screenwriter, primarily known for his works in Telugu Film Industry. Vikram is known for his screen writing to films such as Telugu Movies Race Gurram (2014), Mirapakai (2011) and Konchem Ishtam Konchem Kashtam (2009). Vikram had won the best screenplay award (2009 Nandi award) for Konchem Ishtam Konchem Kashtam (2009) movie on his debut as screenwriter.

Early life 

Vikram Sirikonda was born in Warangal, Telangana and moved to Hyderabad in 1993 along with his family. From his childhood, Vikram had a flair for acting, story writing and dialogues and had written many stage dramas. Vikram has a bachelor's degree in engineering from BMS college, Bangalore and has a diploma in film making from Asian Academy of Film & Television, Delhi.

Career 

After completing his studies, Vikram joined as an assistant director for Tagore (2003), directed by V. V. Vinayak. Vikram continued to assist V. V. Vinayak during Samba (2004) and Bunny (2005). In 2006, Vikram joined Raghava Lawrence as the first assistant director, in Style.

He then ventured into screen-writing and had quick successes in Konchem Ishtam Konchem Kashtam (2009), Mirapakay (2011), and Race Gurram (2014). He made his directional debut with Ravi Teja's Touch Chesi Chudu, in 2018. It was produced by Nallamalapu Bujji and had music by Pritam's apprentice band, JAM8. However, it released to negative reviews from both the critics and audience, alike. It was a huge commercial disaster.

Filmography

Awards 
 Nandi Award, Nandi Award for Best Screenplay Writer, 2009 for Koncham Istam Koncham Kastam
 Akkineni family film award, Best Screenplay, 2009 Best Screenplay Writer for Koncham Istam Koncham Kastam

References

External links 
 http://pressks.com/world/ravi-teja-next-movie-vikram-sirikonda-will-announced-days/5067/
 http://celebscinema.com/film-news/ravi-teja-next-film-race-gurram-writer-vikram-siri/2133/#comment-308
 http://timesofindia.indiatimes.com/entertainment/telugu/movies/news/Ravi-Teja-to-play-cop-in-Race-Gurram-writer-Vikram-Siris-film/articleshow/53417675.cms
 
 Vikram Sirikonda latest movie updates

Living people
Film directors from Telangana
1977 births
Telugu film directors
People from Warangal
Indian male screenwriters
21st-century Indian film directors
Screenwriters from Telangana